Kseniya Alekseyevna Kovalenko (born 26 May 1990) is a Russian footballer who plays as a midfielder and has appeared for the Russia women's national team.

Career
Kovalenko has been capped for the Russia national team, appearing for the team during the 2019 FIFA Women's World Cup qualifying cycle.

References

External links
 
 
 

1995 births
Living people
Russian women's footballers
Russia women's international footballers
Women's association football midfielders
CSP Izmailovo players
WFC Rossiyanka players
ZFK CSKA Moscow players
21st-century Russian women